Rocket to the Moon may refer to:

 The Rocket to the Moon (novel), a 1928 novel by Thea von Harbou
 Rocket to the Moon (play), 1938 play by Clifford Odets
 Rocket to the Moon (ride), ride at Disneyland
 Jules Verne's Rocket to the Moon, 1967 British science fiction film
 A Rocket to the Moon, an American rock band from Braintree, Massachusetts
 Rocket to the Moon (1955 film), a Disney live-action short
 "Rocket to the Moon", a song by Chris Kenner

See also
 Exploration of the Moon, physical exploration of Earth's natural satellite